Hassar may be:
 A common name for Callichthys callichthys.
 A common name for Hoplosternum littorale.
 Hassar (fish), a genus of doradid catfishes.
 Abu Bakr al-Hassar, 11th century Muslim mathematician who first used the fraction bar.